Grivegnée is a district of the city of Liège, Wallonia, located in the province of Liège, Belgium.

It was a municipality until 1977. It has a population of 19,606 (2006).

References 

Sub-municipalities of Liège
Former municipalities of Liège Province